The chain-backed dtella (Gehyra catenata) is a species of gecko in the genus Gehyra, native to Queensland in Australia, and first described by Timothy Low in 1979.

References

Gehyra
Reptiles described in 1979
Geckos of Australia